Srđan Matić (born 15 September 1994) is a Serbian professional footballer who plays as a forward for Borac Šajkaš.

Honours
ČSK Čelarevo
 Serbian League Vojvodina: 2014–15

References

External links
 
 
 

Living people
1994 births
Serbian footballers
Serbian expatriate footballers
Footballers from Novi Sad
Association football forwards
Serbian First League players
Serbian SuperLiga players
Nemzeti Bajnokság II players
FK ČSK Čelarevo players
FK Cement Beočin players
FK Crvena Zvezda Novi Sad players
ATSV Stadl-Paura players
FK Napredak Kruševac players
Szentlőrinci SE footballers
Serbian expatriate sportspeople in Austria
Serbian expatriate sportspeople in Hungary
Expatriate footballers in Austria
Expatriate footballers in Hungary